Edwin Helfant (12 April 1926 Margate, New Jersey – 15 February 1978 Ducktown, Atlantic City) was an American lawyer in  Atlantic City, New Jersey.

Edwin was a New Jersey Bar Association-certified lawyer and part-time Judiciary of New Jersey judge who held court in Somers Point, New Jersey and Galloway Township, New Jersey from 1963 to 1973. He was a known associate of organized crime figure Herman (Stumpy) Orman. Helfant gained posthumous notoriety when he was murdered by Philadelphia Mafia family member Nicholas (Nick The Blade) Virgilio who was a close associate of Nicky Scarfo. His murder was suspected to be related to the murder of Giuseppe (Pepe) Leva, a Pomona, New Jersey tailor who was murdered in Egg Harbor Township, New Jersey for intervening during a brawl between Leva and Phil Leonetti. His law offices were located at the Guarantee Trust Building art 1125 Atlantic Avenue in Atlantic City, New Jersey that she shared with Herman Orman.  At the time of Helfant's murder, he was on trial in Trenton, New Jersey on charges relating to his allegedly accepting $700 to fix an assault and battery case in 1968. A controversial judge, Helfant earned the nickname, "The Fining Squire" during his tenure on the bench in the 1960s and 1970s because of his propensity for fining young underage youth who used phoney identification to enter Jersey Shore bars during the summer months. He was murdered while on trial in Mercer County, New Jersey Trenton, New Jersey on charges of obstructing justice for the 1968 assault case. He was married to a woman named Marcie and was the father of several sons, including Perry who became a defence attorney and Richard, who would later become entertainment coordinator for Sands Atlantic City.

Background
In 1972 Nicholas Virgilio was convicted of murder. A fellow mafioso, Nicodemo Scarfo, contacted Helfant and delivered $12,000 to him, which was to be given to the Supreme Court judge handling the murder case as a bribe, in exchange for a lenient sentence for Virgilio.

However Virgilio received a 12-20 year sentence.  In 1978 he was released on early parole, and vowed revenge on Helfant who apparently had not fulfilled his end of the deal.

Virgilio tracked Helfant and his wife to a cocktail lounge The Flamingo Lounge in Ducktown, Atlantic City, where he shot Helfant 5 times with a .22 caliber pistol while he was drinking at the bar with his wife.

At the time of his death, Helfant was facing conviction for bribery, due to accusations of taking bribes to kick out cases in the Somers Point Municipal Court, where he worked as a part-time Justice.

In 1988 the then boss of the Philadelphia mafia and 16 co-defendants were charged under the 1970 Racketeer Influenced and Corrupt Organizations Act (RICO) and several other murders and drug dealing, extortion and loan-sharking. The defendants were convicted of Helfant's murder.

Virgilio was sentenced to a 40-year jail sentence, partly for this murder, but died of a heart attack on March 15, 1995 at the Federal Medical Center in Springfield, Mo., where he had been sent for heart treatment on Feb. 18, 1994. [Philly.com, 3-18-1995]

References
Blood and Honor, Inside the Scarfo Mob, the Mafia's Most Violent Family George Anastasia (1991 hardcover edition; 2003 paperback edition)

New Jersey state court judges
New Jersey lawyers
American murder victims
Assassinated American judges
1926 births
1978 deaths
People murdered in New Jersey
20th-century American lawyers
20th-century American judges